John Gordon Skellam (1914-1979) was a statistician and ecologist, who discovered the Skellam distribution.

Skellam was born in Staffordshire. He was educated at Hanley High School where he won several scholarships including free admission to New College in Oxford. He was one of the most respected members of the British Region of the Biometric Society.

In 1951, John G. Skellam developed the reaction-diffusion model of invasion biology. This model describes the dynamics of populations, which simultaneously develops and spreads, and provides that the invasion front moves with constant speed. He explained on the basis of habitation muskrat introduced to Europe that only by chance the species may be in a place where it would have to grow.

Skellam has provided a model that allows to take the dynamics of populations as a random variable at any time t. Its stochastic form is much more flexible than previous deterministic equations.

Bibliography

See also 
 Skellam distribution

References 

1914 births
20th-century British zoologists
English statisticians
Alumni of New College, Oxford
1979 deaths
20th-century English  mathematicians
People from Hanley, Staffordshire